Dinky is a 1935 American drama film directed by D. Ross Lederman.

Plot
A crooked businessman skips town, leaving his secretary, Martha Daniels, to take the blame for his illegal business dealings. Faced with a prison term, Martha sends her son, "Dinky," to a military academy to spare him the social disgrace.

Cast
 Jackie Cooper as Dinky Daniels
 Mary Astor as Mrs. Martha Daniels
 Roger Pryor as Tom Marsden
 Henry Armetta as Tony Karamazo, the junkman
 Betty Jean Hainey as Mary
 Henry O'Neill as Colonel Barnes
 Jimmy Butler as Cadet Lane
 George Ernest as Jojo
 Edith Fellows as Sally
 Sidney Miller as Sammy
 Richard Quine as Jackie Shaw

References

External links
 

1935 films
1935 drama films
American drama films
American black-and-white films
1930s English-language films
Films directed by D. Ross Lederman
Films directed by Howard Bretherton
Warner Bros. films
1930s American films